Autsho is a village in north-eastern Bhutan near the border with Tibet. It is located in Lhuntse District.

At the 2005 census its population was 301.

References

Populated places in Bhutan